Jean-Luc Kanapé is an Innu activist and actor from Canada, most prominent as a caribou conservationist. A researcher for the Pessamit Innu Band council, he is involved in efforts to track and monitor the population of caribou in the Pipmuacan region near Pessamit and Baie-Comeau.

In 2021 he received an emerging leadership award from the First Nations Guardians Gathering, an organization of indigenous environmentalists and conservationists.

He had his first acting role in the 2021 film Nouveau Québec, for which he received a Canadian Screen Award nomination for Best Supporting Performance in a Film at the 11th Canadian Screen Awards in 2023.

References

21st-century Canadian male actors
21st-century First Nations people
Canadian male film actors
Canadian conservationists
First Nations activists
First Nations male actors
Innu people
Male actors from Quebec
People from Côte-Nord
Living people